TV da Gente is a Brazilian television station with channel granted in Pacajus, and with soothes in Fortaleza, both cities of the state of Ceará. In the digital terrestrial television local, it operates on channel 25 UHF, and was inaugurated on November 20, 2005 by the singer and politician Netinho de Paula, with resources coming from the Fundação Educativa Eduardo Sá. Between 2005 and 2007, the station maintained its headquarters in São Paulo, and was a television network tuned by satellite, reaching some regions of the country. However, due to an administrative-financial crisis, it has lost its national coverage, and consequently no longer appears in all cities. Currently, the station has only open signal in the cities near Fortaleza. At the outset, it adopted a community format, and served to serve the black public.

External links
 Guardian Unlimited Special Report - Brazil's first black television channel tackles legacy of 300 years of slavery, Tom Phillips in São Paulo
 Target Market News - Brazil’s first black channel, ‘TV da Gente,’ makes its debut Stan Lehman, Associated Press, December 11, 2005
 Collegiate Online - Brazil's new channel breaks color barrier, Colin McMahon, Knight Ridder Newspapers
 OhmyNews - Black TV Channel Ignites Ire in Brazil, Ana Maria Brambilla, January 16, 2006
 L.A. Times via Vivirlatino.com - Brazil's Black Television Station: Is it Racist?

Portuguese-language television networks
Television networks in Brazil
Television channels and stations established in 2005
Mass media in São Paulo